Samallie Kiyingi is an Australian/Ugandan finance lawyer, who serves as the Director of Legal Affairs at the African Export–Import Bank, since April 2017.

Early life and education
She was born to Ugandan parents, the late Robinah Kasirye Kiyingi, a lawyer and Dr. Aggrey Kiyingi, a cardiologist. She holds a Bachelor's Degree of Law and Arts in International Studies and a Graduate Diploma of Legal Practice, both awarded  by the University of Technology Sydney, in Sydney, Australia. She is also admitted as a solicitor in New South Wales, Australia and in England and Wales.

Career
Kiyingi began her career as a banking lawyer at Ashurst LLP, which previously was Blake Dawson Waldron, in Sydney, Australia. She then worked as a Senior Associate at Clifford Chance, in London.

She also worked as a Director and the Head of the Securitization Regulatory Policy and Advisory Group at Deutsche Bank, based in London. At the time she was hired by Afreximbank, she was an independent consultant advising corporations and regulators on capital markets.

At the African Export Import Bank, she serves as the Director of Legal Services and as the corporate General Counsel.

Other considerations
Kiyingi is a founding member of the African Art Acquisition Committee, of the Tate Modern Art Gallery, in
London, United Kingdom.

In 2018, Kiyingi was recognised as one of the 100 most influential people of African descent under 40 years of age, by
The Most Influential 100 Company.

See also
 African Export–Import Bank
 Sylvia Tamale
 Peninnah Tukamwesiga
 Patience Tumusiime Rubagumya

References

External links
Afreximbank Will Increase Trade Financing In Uganda - Kiyingi
Afreximbank’s Legal Director Named Among 2018 Most Influential People of African Descent As of 6 May 2018.

1970s births
Living people
People from Central Region, Uganda
Ugandan expatriates in Australia
Australia–Uganda relations
Ganda people
University of Technology Sydney Law School alumni
21st-century English lawyers
20th-century Australian lawyers